In viticulture, the climates of wine regions are categorised based on the overall characteristics of the area's climate during the growing season. While variations in macroclimate are acknowledged, the climates of most wine regions are categorised (somewhat loosely based on the Köppen climate classification) as being part of a Mediterranean (for example Tuscany), maritime (ex: Bordeaux) or continental climate (ex: Columbia Valley). The majority of the world's premium wine production takes place in one of these three climate categories in locations between the 30th parallel and 50th parallel in both the northern and southern hemisphere. While viticulture does exist in some tropical climates, most notably Brazil, the amount of quality wine production in those areas is so small that the climate effect has not been as extensively studied as other categories.

Influence of climate on viticulture

Beyond establishing whether or not viticulture can even be sustained in an area, the climatic influences of a particular area goes a long way in influencing the type of grape varieties grown in a region and the type of viticultural practices that will be used. The presence of adequate sun, heat and water are all vital to the healthy growth and development of grapevines during the growing season. Additionally, continuing research has shed more light on the influence of dormancy that occurs after harvest when the grapevine essentially shuts down and reserves its energy for the beginning of the next year's growing cycle.

In general, grapevines thrive in temperate climates which grant the vines long, warm periods during the crucial flowering, fruit set and ripening periods. Below this temperature, the vines are usually in a period of dormancy. Drastically below this temperature, such as the freezing point of  the vines can be damaged by frost. When the average daily temperature is between  the vine will begin flowering. When temperatures rise up to  many of the vine's physiological processes are in full stride as grape clusters begin to ripen on the vine. One of the characteristics that differentiates the various climate categories from one another is the occurrence and length of time that these optimal temperatures appear during the growing season.

In addition to temperature, the amount of rainfall (and the need for supplemental irrigation) is another defining characteristics. In Mediterranean and many continental climates, the climate during the growing season may be quite dry and require additional irrigation. In contrast, maritime climates often suffer the opposite extreme of having too much rainfall during the growing season which poses its own viticultural hazards.

Other climate factors such as wind, humidity, atmospheric pressure, sunlight as well as diurnal temperature variations—which can define different climate categories—can also have pronounced influences on the viticulture of an area.

Mediterranean climates

 

Wine regions with Mediterranean climates are characterised by their long growing seasons of moderate to warm temperatures. Throughout the year there is little seasonal change, with temperatures in the winter generally warmer than those of maritime and continental climates. During the grapevine growing season, there is very little rainfall (with most precipitation occurring in the winter months) which increases the risk of the viticultural hazard of drought and may present the need for supplemental irrigation.

The Mediterranean climate is most readily associated with the areas around the Mediterranean basin, where viticulture and winemaking first flourished on a large scale due to the influence of the Phoenicians, Greeks, and Romans of the ancient world.

Wine regions with Mediterranean climates
Tuscany and most other Central-Southern Italian wine regions
Liguria
Marsala, Sicily
Pantelleria
Sardinia
Most Greek wine regions
Cyprus wine regions
Israeli wine regions
Jordanian wine regions
Lebanese wine regions
Palestinian wine regions
Most Albanian wine regions
Most Montenegrin wine regions
Corsica
Languedoc and Roussillon
Provence
Southern Rhone Valley
Malta
Andalusia including Jerez de la Frontera
Balearic Islands
Canary Islands (bordering tropical)
Catalonia
Jumilla, Spain
Vinos de Madrid
Most Portuguese wine regions
Primorska Slovenian wine region (Cfa)
Coastal Croatian wine regions (Cfa)
Some Azerbaijani wine regions
Napa Valley and other coastal California wine regions
Southern Oregon AVA
Baja California wine regions
Western Australian and South Australian wine regions
Chilean Central Valley 
Western coastal South African wine regions
Western and southern coastal Turkish wine regions:
Aegean Region
Marmara Region (bordering maritime)
Mediterranean Region
Thracian Lowlands, Southern Bulgarian wine region (Cfa)
Upper Struma Valley, Southwestern Bulgarian wine region (Cfa)
Azores (bordering maritime)
Madeira
Algerian wine regions
Egyptian wine regions (irrigated by the Nile system)
Moroccan wine regions
Tunisian wine regions
Shiraz wine region, Iran (until 1979, since largely grown in Australia and South Africa)

Continental climates

Wine regions with continental climates are characterised by the very marked seasonal changes that occur throughout the growing season, with hot temperatures during the summer season and winters cold enough for periodic ice and snow. This is generally described as having a high degree of continentality. Regions with this type of climate are often found inland on continents without a significant body of water (such as an inland sea) that can moderate their temperatures. Often during the growing season continental climates will have wide diurnal temperature variations, with very warm temperatures during the day that drop drastically at night. During the winter and early spring months, frost and hail can be viticultural hazards. Depending on the particular macroclimate of the region, irrigation may be needed to supplement seasonal rainfall. These many climatic influences contribute to the wide vintage variation that is often typical of continental climates such as Burgundy.

There are more wine regions with continental climates in the northern hemisphere than there are in the southern hemisphere. This is due, in part, to small land mass size of southern hemisphere continents relative to the large oceans nearby. This difference means that the oceans exert a more direct influence on the climate of the southern hemisphere wine regions (making them maritime or possibly Mediterranean) than they would on the larger northern hemisphere continents. There are also several wine regions (such as Spain) that have areas that exhibit a continental Mediterranean climate due to their altitude or distance from the sea. These regions will have more distinct seasonal change than Mediterranean climates, but still retain some characteristics like a long growing season that is very dry during the summer.

Wine regions with continental climates
Burgundy (maritime by US standards)
Côte-Rôtie and other Northern Rhone wine regions (maritime by US standards)
Jura wine region (maritime by US standards)
Most of the Loire Valley (maritime by US standards)
Rioja (Cfa/Cfb)
Italian Piedmont and most other Northern Italian wine regions (Cfa/Cfb)
Douro (Mediterranean by US standards)
Saale-Unstrut, Germany
Saxony
Armenian wine regions
Most Austrian wine regions
Most Bulgarian wine regions
Inland Croatia
Most Czech wine regions
Most Hungarian wine regions
Kazakh wine regions
Most Macedonian wine regions
Most Moldovan wine regions
Polish wine regions
Most Romanian wine regions
Most Russian wine regions
Most Serbian wine regions
Most Slovak wine regions
Podravje and Posavje, Slovenia
Inland Turkish wine regions including Central Anatolia and Eastern Anatolia
Most Ukrainian wine regions
Sabile, Latvia
Most Canadian wine regions (including Okanagan Valley, British Columbia and except western BC)
Mendoza, Argentina (subtropical)
Central Delaware Valley AVA (PA/NJ)
Columbia Valley (includes Walla Walla Valley (Csa) and Yakima Valley)
Most of Cumberland Valley AVA (PA/MD)
Eastern Connecticut Highlands AVA
Finger Lakes, NY
Grand Valley, Colorado
Hudson River Region
Lake Erie AVA (NY/PA/OH)
Lake Michigan Shore AVA, Michigan
Lancaster Valley AVA, Pennsylvania
Lehigh Valley AVA, Pennsylvania
Missouri Rhineland
Niagara Escarpment AVA, NY
Most of Ohio River Valley AVA (IN/KY/OH/WV)
Most of Ozark Mountain AVA (AR/MO/OK)
Most of Snake River Valley AVA (Idaho/Oregon)
Mainland Southeastern New England AVA (CT/MA/RI)
Texas Davis Mountains AVA
Texas High Plains
Upper Mississippi River Valley AVA (IL/IA/MN/WI)
Western Connecticut Highlands AVA
Most Hokkaido wine regions
Nagano Prefecture, Japan
Tendō, Yamagata
Beijing wine region
Ningxia, China
Xinjiang wine regions
Yantai, China
East of Cascade Range, Washington state, United States

Maritime climates

 
 

Wine regions with maritime climates are characterised by their close proximity to large bodies of water (such as oceans, estuaries and inland seas) that moderate their temperatures. Maritime climates share many characteristics with both Mediterranean and continental climates and are often described as a "middle ground" between the two extremes. Like Mediterranean climates, maritime climates have a long growing season, with water currents moderating the region's temperatures. However, Mediterranean climates are usually very dry during the growing season, and maritime climates are often subject to the viticultural hazards of excessive rain and humidity that may promote various grape diseases, such as mold and mildew. Like continental climates, maritime climates will have distinct seasonal changes, but they are usually not as drastic, with warm, rather than hot, summers and cool, rather than cold, winters. Maritime climates also exist in some wine-growing areas of highlands of subtropical and tropical latitudes, including the southern Appalachian Mountains in the United States, the eastern Australian highlands and the central highlands of Mexico.

Wine regions with maritime climates
Bordeaux
Champagne
Irouléguy AOC, Lower Navarre
Madiran wine region, Gascony
Muscadet
Alsace and Lorraine (continental by French standards)
Most German wine regions (continental by French standards)
Liechtenstein wine regions (continental by French standards)
Moselle Valley including Luxembourg (continental by French standards)
Most Swiss wine regions (continental by French standards)
Bizkaiko Txakolina, Basque Country
Rías Baixas (Csb)
New Zealand wine regions
Southern Chile including Bío Bío Valley, Itata Valley, and Malleco Valley (Csb)
Block Island, Cape Cod, Martha's Vineyard (Cfa), and Nantucket (all part of Southeastern New England AVA and bordering continental)
Long Island (Cfa bordering continental, primarily east end, and including the North Fork and The Hamptons)
North Fork of Roanoke, Virginia
Puget Sound (Csb)
Rocky Knob AVA, Virginia
Some of Shenandoah Valley AVA (VA/WV)
Upper Hiwassee Highlands (GA/NC)(mostly Cfa)
Volcano Winery, Hawaii
Willamette Valley (Csb)
Alpine Valleys, Victoria
Australian Pyrenees
Bowral, New South Wales
Most of Canberra District wine region
Cowra highlands, New South Wales
Fleurieu zone including Kangaroo Island and Langhorne Creek, South Australia (Csb)
Gippsland, Victoria
Grampians, Victoria
Granite Belt, Queensland/NSW
Heathcote wine region, Victoria
Henty, Victoria
Mudgee highlands, New South Wales
Orange, New South Wales
Port Phillip, Victoria (includes Mornington Peninsula and Yarra Valley)
Tasmania
Tumbarumba wine region, NSW (semi-arid)
Fraser Valley, British Columbia
Gulf Islands, BC
Vancouver Island wine regions including Cowichan Valley, BC
Médanos, Buenos Aires Province
Río Negro Province, Argentina (semi-arid)
Tarija wine region, Bolivia
Caxias do Sul, Brazil
São Joaquim, Brazil
Eastern Cape wine-growing areas including St Francis Bay, South Africa
KwaZulu-Natal highlands
Mossel Bay, Western Cape, South Africa (semi-arid)
Some highland Ethiopian wine regions
Belgian wine regions
Most Danish wine regions
Dutch wine regions
England and Wales
Southern Ireland
Some Georgian wine regions
Some Abkhazian wine regions
Some Crimean wine regions including Massandra
Some Krasnodar Krai wine regions
Some Black Sea Region Turkish wine regions
Pico IPR, Pico, Azores, Portugal
Da Lat, Vietnam
Chã das Caldeiras, Cape Verde
Areas of Aguascalientes, Guanajuato, Hidalgo, Querétaro, and Zacatecas, central highlands of Mexico
Some Kashmir wine regions
Thimphu wine region, Bhutan
Matsumae Peninsula, Hokkaido
West of Cascade Range, Washington state, United States (Csb)

See also
Climate classification

Notes

References

Climate and weather classification systems
Viticulture
Wine terminology